Nepalese folklore is a diverse set of mythology and traditional beliefs held by the Nepali people.

Folk beliefs 

 Banjhakri and Banjhakrini, supernatural shamans of the forest.
 Bir, a demon
Boksi, a witch
 Budhahang, legendary Kirati king who could stop movement of sun 
 Chhauda, a child ghost 
 Kichkandi, type a female ghost.
 Lakhey and Majipa Lakhey, types of demon.
 Masan, a demon
Murkatta, a headless ghost with eyes and mouth in chest
 Yeti, an ape-like creature purported to inhabit the mountains of Nepal.

See also 

 Culture of Nepal

References 

Nepalese folklore
Nepalese culture